Ex-Muslims of North America (EXMNA) is a non-profit organization which describes itself as advocating for acceptance of religious dissent, promoting secular values, and aiming to reduce discrimination faced by those who leave Islam.

History
The organization was founded in 2013 in Washington, D.C., by Sarah Haider and Muhammad Syed, and in Toronto by Sadar Ali and Nas Ishmael. They say that it is the first organization of its kind to "establish communities exclusive to ex-Muslims in order to foster a sense of camaraderie and offer a space free of judgement for lack of religiosity."

Organization
Its stated mission is to reduce discrimination faced by those who leave Islam, advocate for acceptance of religious dissent, and promote secular values; counter the isolation facing non-theist ex-Muslims by fostering communities and support networks; and strive to amplify diverse ex-Muslim voices and experiences, and stand against those who seek to stifle criticism of Islam.

The organization has chapters in 25 cities across North America, a BBC article says that the organization has about 1,000 volunteers in 25 cities in North America and an article in the Democrat and Chronicle says that the group has about 4,000 total members.

The organization is run by staff, volunteers and relies on donations.

Activities

EXMNA organizes support chapters across the United States and Canada which are closed-group meetings for safety reasons; individuals who wish to attend the support group events must go through a screening process for identity authentication purposes.

EXMNA provides emergency support and grants to ex-Muslims in dire times – from escaping abuse to finding shelter and professional assistance. In 2018 Mahad Olad, a US college student was taken to Kenya and held against his will. He was to undergo conversion therapy to cure his apostasy and homosexuality. He was rescued through EXMNA's efforts and provided a grant to pay for his flight back to the US. 

EXMNA spearheaded a campaign which successfully pressured Twitter to reverse its decision to submit to a request by the Pakistan Telecommunication Authority to block content and accounts which the agency deemed blasphemous in what a report by The New York Times said was the first time that the social networking service had agreed to withhold content in Pakistan.

EXMNA went on a 2017–2018 campus tour across North America in what the organization said was a first-of-its kind effort to bring Muslim apostates and other activists to colleges across the United States and Canada.

WikiIslam 
In late 2015, EXMNA took over ownership of the website WikiIslam. 

In 2018, Daniel Enstedt cited WikiIslam as an example of a website containing anti-Muslim rhetoric, and Goran Larsson cited WikiIslam as an "anti-Muslim webpage." In 2019, Asma Uddin, advisor on religious liberty to OSCE and a fellow at the Aspen Institute, reiterated WikiIslam to be a "rampantly anti-Muslim website". The same year, Syaza Shukri, Professor of Political Sciences at International Islamic University Malaysia, deemed the lack of positive content on WikiIslam to demonstrate a  "definite agenda": the promotion of a monolithic version of Islam—violent, oppressive, and unrepresentative of "how a majority of Muslims view their religion". In 2022, Rabia Kamal, a cultural anthropologist based at University of San Francisco, noted WikiIslam to be of the many Islamophobic websites dedicated to "surveillance" of Islam and Muslims.

In March 2021, EXMNA announced that it had implemented new content standards on WikiIslam, archived and deleted articles that did not meet those standards, and initiated re-writes of other articles.

Reactions
Haider said in a 2015 address to the American Humanist Association that "I always expected feeling unwelcome from Muslim audiences, but I did not anticipate an equal amount of hostility from my allies on the left." Her critics have accused her of being  an Uncle Tom and a native informant. Yet she maintains she is a progressive liberal and the organization EXMNA has no certain political affiliation.

In 2016 a Wegmans in Fairfax, Virginia, refused to make a cake for the organization that was to be used in celebration of the third anniversary of the group's founding after a supervisor deemed the name of the group offensive; the company subsequently filled the cake order free of charge and issued an apology to EXMNA after legal intervention by a staff attorney from the Freedom From Religion Foundation who described the decision by the employee to refuse service as "a potential civil rights violation".

In 2017, Facebook locked out EXMNA's account for a week because it had allegedly violated the company's terms of service although it did not specify which standards the account had allegedly violated. The page was subsequently unblocked, with a Facebook spokesperson saying in an email to the Observer that "the pages were removed in error and restored as soon as we were able to investigate."

References

External links
 

Atheist organizations
Criticism of Islam
Former Muslims organizations
Organizations established in 2013
Organizations based in Washington, D.C.
2013 establishments in Washington, D.C.
501(c)(3) organizations
Articles containing video clips